Nervous in the Alley may refer to:

"Nervous in the Alley", a song by Less Than Jake from the album Hello Rockview
"Nervous in the Alley", a song by Smash Mouth from the album Fush Yu Mang